Organic wild refers to organic agriculture products which are collected from wild land. As of 2005, organic wild products are farmed on approximately 62 million hectares. According to the International Federation of Organic Agricultural Movements 36% of these were bamboo shoots, 21% were fruits and berries, and 19% were nuts (IFOAM 2007:10). The first IFOAM conference on organic wild products was held in May 2006.

See also

Agriculture
Organic farming
Wildculture

References
Willer, Helga and Yussefi, Minou, Eds. (2007) The World of Organic Agriculture - Statistics and Emerging Trends 2007. International Federation of Organic Agriculture Movements (IFOAM), DE-Bonn and Research Institute of Organic Agriculture, FiBL, CH-Frick.

Citations

Organic food